Bagru print is a form of hand block printing done by natural colours followed by the Chippa's (involved in fabric printing tradition for over 100 years) in Bagru, India. These prints of Bagru are acclaimed all over  world. The Prints of Bagru, unlike other prints, involve a different kind of printing. The unique method for printing employs wooden block in it. In this process, the desired design is engraved first on wooden block and then carved block is used for replicating the design in the preferred color on the fabric.

See also
 Bagh print

References

Textile printing
Relief printing
Rajasthani arts
Painted fabrics
Textile arts of India
Indian handicrafts
Indian clothing
Printed fabrics
Geographical indications in Madhya Pradesh
Folk art
Indian culture